The third election to Glamorgan County Council election was held on 4 March 1895. It was preceded by the 1892 election and followed by the 1898 election.

Glamorgan County Council had been established by the 1888 Local Government Act, and the first elections held in early 1889. The county of Glamorgan was at this time becoming heavily industrialised, although some areas such as the Vale of Glamorgan remained essentially rural. The rise of nonconformist liberalism, especially since the 1860s, throughout Wales, had challenged the prevailing influence of the landed gentry. However, even in 1889, the traditional forces remained influential and no working men were elected to the Council. This changed in 1892 with the unopposed return of David Morgan in Aberdare and the success of Isaac Evans in Resolven.

Overview of the Result
As in most parts of Wales, the Liberal Party was once again triumphant and won a majority of the seats. In 1895 there were more unopposed results than in previous elections and the Conservatives made some headway, reflecting the position in the United Kingdom as a whole where the party took power that year.

Results are drawn from the Cardiff Times.  Results also appeared in the Celt (Bala). Some additional results are drawn from local newspapers in South Wales.

Boundary Changes
There were some boundary changes at this election. In the Aberdare area the wards were reorganised too reflect those operating for the new Aberdare Urban District Council.

An additional ward was created at Cadoxton following the division of the existing Barry division.

Unopposed Returns
As in previous elections there were a fair number of unopposed returns, including some seats not contested by the Liberals.

Retiring Aldermen
Of the eleven retiring aldermen, two were Conservatives. Following the episode in 1892 when all but two aldermen did not seek re-election, only for the Council to decide that this was a pre-requisite for election as aldermen, a larger number sought re-election. Each was re-elected, including Sir John Llewelyn at Loughor and Penderry, although he faced Liberal opposition unlike in 1889.

Those who did not seek re-election included F.L. Davis at Ferndale.

Contested Elections
There were more uncontested elections than in the previous two contests for the County Council and the vast majority of those contested were straight fights between Liberal and Conservative candidates (or in some cases Independents who were widely regarded as Conservatives). In a small number of cases, Liberals faced each other.

Results

Aberaman
The sitting member, first elected at the 1889 election and re-elected in 1895 was opposed by Thomas Rees, landlord of the Swan Hotel, Aberaman and elected a member of the Aberdare Urban District Council at the inaugural 1894 election. The Merthyr Times opined that there was no necessity for a contest, and that the unsuccessful candidate had wasted his time and money.

Aberavon
John Morgan Smith had previously stood as an Independent, though this was commonly regarded as meaning Conservative.

Aberdare Town

Barry
The former seat of Barry and Cadoxton was divided.

Blaengwawr
The new Blaengwawr ward was created following boundary changes connected to the formation of the Aberdare Urban District Council.

Bridgend
The election was fought on party lines and covered in detail in the Glamorgan Gazette.  The election was said to have attracted 'an exceptionally keen and widespread interest, not only immediately within the town boundaries, but in many an adjacent town, hamlet and village besides'.  Against the tide in the county the Liberals captured Bridgend for the first time

Briton Ferry

Cadoxton
Boundary Changes. A new seat of Cadoxton was created.

Caeharris

Caerphilly
As a result of boundary changes, two sitting members opposed each other. Hill-Male admitted that he had once been a Conservative but claimed to have been converted to the Liberal cause during his twenty years in Wales.

Cilfynydd

Coedffranc

Coity

Cowbridge

Cwmavon
It was reported that Thomas Davies, the sitting member, was expected to be returned unopposed, but he was opposed by Llewellyn Griffiths, overseer, and a fellow deacon at Penuel Baptist Church, Cwmavon. Davies eventually withdrew.

Cyfarthfa
The result was largely attributed to the fact that Thomas was a member of several public bodies and this was a difficult argument to counter.

Cymmer

Dinas Powys

Dowlais

Dulais Valley

Ferndale
Morgan Thomas, the sitting member, was defeated by another Liberal candidate.

Gadlys
Morgan was re-elected although heavily defeated in the Aberdare Urban District Council election a short time before.

Garw Valley

Gellifaelog 1895

Gelligaer

Gower

Kibbor

Llandaff

Llandeilo Talybont

Llansamlet

Llantrisant

Llwydcoed
As a result of boundary changes, the Hirwaun Ward had been abolished and the sitting member, Richard Morgan, challenged the incumbent, Rees Hopkin Rhys in the Llwydcoed Ward.

Llwynypia and Clydach

Lougher and Penderry

Maesteg
James Barrow, the sitting member, was opposed by another Liberal candidate, Jenkin Jones, due to his voting against disestablishment at a council meeting. It was a lively election, with all workmen having a holiday, leaving the streets crowded throughout the day. On the following day, some od Barrow's supporters paraded through the locality on horseback but were attacked by women who threw buckets of water and ashes over them.

Margam

Merthyr Town
This result was attributed by the Merthyr Times to Liberal Party apathy and to publicans' support for the Conservative candidate.

Merthyr Vale
There was initially some uncertainty whether Walter Bell, who had been narrowly defeated in 1892, would oppose the sitting member.

Morriston

Mountain Ash

Neath (North)

Neath (South)

Newcastle

Ogmore
In this largely rural ward, J.D. Nicholl of Merthyr Mawr captured the seat, reversing the result of three years previously.

Ogmore Valley

Oystermouth

Penarth North

Penarth South

Penrhiwceiber

Pentre

Penydarren

Pontardawe

Plymouth

Pontlottyn
Two rival Liberal candidates enabled innkeeper David Benjamin Owen to win by 23 votes from Baptist minister John Penry Williams.

Pontypridd

Porth and Penygraig

Resolven

Sketty

Swansea Valley
Boundary Change

Treforest

Treherbert

Treorchy

Trealaw and Tonypandy

Tylorstown and Ynyshir

Ystalyfera

Ystrad

Election of Aldermen

In addition to the 66 councillors the council consisted of 22 county aldermen. Aldermen were elected by the council, and served a six-year term. Following the 1895 election, there were twelve Aldermanic vacancies (the additional one following the death of a sitting alderman).

The following aldermen were appointed by the newly elected council. They included three miners' agents who, together with Moses Moses, elected as alderman in 1892, made four labour members on the aldermanic bench. Conversely, following the retirement of Sir William Thomas Lewis, Sir John Llewellyn was now the only Conservative among the aldermen. Lewis and another retiring alderman, the prominent Liberal, Thomas Williams of Gwaelod y Garth, received some votes (presumably from Conservative councillors) but the liberal group held to the convention that only elected councillors could be made aldermen.

J. T. D. Llewellyn, Conservative, retiring alderman (elected councillor at Lougher and Penderry)
Walter H. Morgan, Liberal, retiring alderman (elected councillor at Pontypridd)
John Jones Griffiths, Liberal, retiring alderman (elected councillor at Porth)
Dr H. Naunton Davies, Liberal, retiring alderman (elected councillor at Cymmer)
William Morgan, Liberal, retiring alderman (elected councillor at Treherbert)
Evan Lewis, Liberal  (elected councillor at Gellifaelog)
Richard Lewis, Liberal  (elected councillor at Llwynypia and Clydach)
Isaac Evans, Liberal-Labour (elected councillor at Resolven)
David Davies, Liberal (elected councillor at Penydarren)
David Morgan, Liberal-Labour (elected councillor at Gadlys)
John Thomas, Liberal-Labour (elected councillor at Garw Valley)

elected for three years
James Barrow, Liberal (elected councillor at Maesteg)

By-elections

Cymmer

Gadlys by-election
Following the election of David Morgan as alderman, Richard Morgan, member for Hirwaun from 1889 until 1895 was selected as Liberal candidate following a well-attended public meeting.  As a result of boundary changes, Morgan had contested Llwydcoed against Rees Hopkin Rhys and had been narrowly defeated. Richard Morgan's selection was not immediately accepted and other meetings were held to promote other candidates, including Benjamin Evans.  Eventually, however, Richard Morgan was comfortably elected.

Garw Valley by-election
Following the election of John Thomas, miners' agent, as alderman, D. Johns was elected after a contest with two other Liberal candidates, including Thomas Lewis who was also unsuccessful at the initial election.

Gellifaelog by-election
Following the election of Evan Lewis as alderman, concerns had been expressed that a split Liberal vote would lead to a Conservative victory.   But this did not prove to be the case.

Loughor and Penderry by-election
Following the election of Sir John Llewelyn as alderman, Samuel Thomas, defeated by Llewelyn at the original election, was now returned. His opponent had sought to succeed Llewelyn on his appointment as alderman in 1889 but was defeated on that occasion by Edward Rice Daniel. This can be considered a Liberal hold as Daniel had stood down at the original election in favour of Llewelyn.

Llwynypia and Clydach by-election

Maesteg by-election
Following the election of James Barrow as alderman, Jenkin Jones, narrowly defeated in a hotly contested initial election, was on this occasion successful.

Penydarren by-election

The by-election took place following the election of David Davies, Glebeland, as alderman. Thomas Williams, Gwaelodygarth, Merthyr, vice-chairman of the previous council, did not seek re-election partly due to the desire of Davies, as the sitting councillor, to contest the seat but also because Williams himself was visiting Palestine and Egypt.

Pontypridd by-election
Following the re-election of Walter Morgan as alderman, Hopkin Smith Davies, who stood down in his favour, was returned amongst 'great enthusiasm'.

Porth and Penygraig by-election
The election followed John Jones Griffiths's re-election as alderman.

Resolven by-election
Following the election of Isaac Evans as alderman, Daniel Evans of Abergwynfi was elected in a four-cornered contest.

Treherbert by-election

Following the re-election of William Morgan as alderman, John Walters, who had stood down to enable Morgan to be re-elected, retained his seat.

References

Bibliography

1895
1895 Welsh local elections
19th century in Glamorgan